Mikesell is a surname. Notable people with the surname include:

Brent Mikesell (born 1967), American powerlifter
Raymond Mikesell (1913–2006), American economist